Aganbegyan is an Armenian surname. Notable people with the surname include:

Abel Aganbegyan (born 1932), Russian Soviet economist
Ruben Aganbegyan (born 1972), Russian economist, son of Abel

Armenian-language surnames